Mateo Cañellas Martorell, commonly known as Mateu Cañellas (born 27 April 1972 in Inca, Mallorca), is a retired Spanish middle distance runner and former politician. He served as Minister of Sports and Youth of the Baleric Islands from 2007 to 2010 in the Antich II government. He was member of the regionalist party Majorcan Union. In 2011, he was accused of being a part of a corruption case in his party, and given liberty with charges, until in 2016 he was acquitted.

Achievements

External links

References

1972 births
Living people
Spanish male middle-distance runners
World Athletics Championships athletes for Spain
Sportspeople from Mallorca
Spanish politicians
20th-century Spanish people
21st-century Spanish politicians
People from Inca, Mallorca
Sportsperson-politicians